Balar Winery  is a Bulgarian winery that manufactures boutique red and rose wines from Cabernet Sauvignon, Merlot and Syrah, and white wine from the varieties Muscat and Traminer.

The company was founded in 2005. The winery is located in the village Skalica, Yambol region . Own vineyards occupy an area of 130 decares.

About 
The company name "Balar" comes from the old Bulgarian word defining the concept of "learned man". Historically for the Bulgarians BAL (the knowledge) is the highest concept in the worldview of the ancient ancestors as Balar means "sage." In Sanskrit the word "Balar" means "strength."

"K" line
The fine, boutique wines from the K line are K1, K3, K5, K7 and K9. They are a blend of the Merlot, Syrah and Cabernet Sauvignon varieties, grown in Bulgarian vineyards.

Awards

Vitalized Wine 
Vitalizing is a process of prolonged exposure to sound waves introduced directly into the wine so as to alter the structure and spectrum of radiation of the molecules in the beverage. The wine is sounded in this way with specially selected classical music, multiplies its qualities and positive effect on the human organism.

See also 
 Bulgarian wine
List of Bulgarian wine regions
List of wine-producing regions
 List of vineyards and wineries

References 
 Vinaria  
 Chitanka.info
 Avgustiada Wine Festival
 History of Bulgarian Wine. Bulgarian Wine Direct.

External links 
 official website
  Catalog of the Bulgarian Wine

Wineries of Bulgaria
Yambol Province